Traveller is a studio album by Indian sitarist Anoushka Shankar, released in October 2011 through Deutsche Grammophon. The album was produced by Javier Limón.

Traveller received a nomination in the Best World Music Album category at the 2013 Grammy Awards. However, the award went to Anoushka's late father Ravi Shankar (for his album The Living Room Sessions Part 1), and was accepted by Anoushka on his behalf.

Background
Shankar first came across flamenco when she travelled to Spain as a teenager. During that trip, she visited a small flamenco bar and was electrified by different stage performances. Her album Traveller was built around the idea that Spanish flamenco may have its origins in India. "In Indian music, we call it 'spirituality,' and in Spanish music, it's 'passion'. It's really the same thing in both forms, that reaching at the deepest part of the human soul," said Shankar.

To record the album, Shankar travelled to Spain and enlisted the help of flamenco producer and guitarist Javier Limón. During the early studio sessions, they would sit across from each other with their instruments, exploring the musical conversation between them.

Critical reception
Traveller has received generally favourable reviews. In a positive review for South Asian Diaspora, Ashutosh Ravikrishnan cited "the dark masterpiece" as Shankar's best work, saying, "Traveller is hard to ignore; its music captivates you and forces you to feel and think."

Track listing

Chart performance
Traveller has sold 52,000 copies worldwide.

Weekly charts

Release history

References

2011 albums
Anoushka Shankar albums
Deutsche Grammophon albums
Flamenco albums